The Men's 100 metre backstroke S7 event at the 2020 Paralympic Games took place on 30 August 2021, at the Tokyo Aquatics Centre.

Records

Heats 
The swimmers with the top 8 times, regardless of heat, advanced to the final.

References 

Swimming at the 2020 Summer Paralympics